The municipality of San Juan is divided into 18 barrios, 16 of which fall within the former (until 1951) municipality of Río Piedras. Eight of the barrios are further divided into subbarrios, and they include the two barrios that originally composed the municipality of San Juan (namely, San Juan Antiguo and Santurce):

Former municipality of Río Piedras

Caimito
Cupey (formerly two barrios: Cupey Alto and Cupey Bajo)
El Cinco
Gobernador Piñero
Hato Rey Central

Hato Rey Central is divided into four subbarrios:
Ciudad Nueva
Floral Park
Las Monjas
Quintana

Hato Rey Norte
Hato Rey Norte is divided into four subbarrios:
El Vedado
Eleanor Roosevelt
Martín Peña
Puerto Nuevo

Hato Rey Sur
Hato Rey Sur is divided into four subbarrios: 
Bella Vista
Hyde Park
La 37
Santa Rita

Monacillo
Monacillo Urbano
Oriente
Oriente is divided into three subbarrios: 
Borínquen
López Sicardó
San José

Río Piedras Pueblo 

Río Piedras Pueblo is divided into six subbarrios:
Buen Consejo
Capetillo
Monte Rey
Río Piedras Antiguo
Ubarri
Venezuela

Quebrada Arenas
Sabana Llana Norte
Sabana Llana Sur
Tortugo
Universidad
Universidad is divided in four subbarrios:
Amparo
Auxilio Mutuo
Institución
Valencia

Former municipality of San Juan (until 1951)

San Juan Antiguo 

San Juan Antiguo is a barrio in the municipality of San Juan and it is divided into seven subbarrios:
Ballajá
Catedral
Marina
Mercado
Puerta de Tierra
San Cristóbal
San Francisco

Santurce

Santurce is a barrio in the municipality of San Juan. Its population in 2020 was 69,469.
Santurce is divided into 40 subbarrios:

Alto del Cabro
Bayola
Bolívar
Buenos Aires
Campo Alegre
Chícharo
Condadito
Condado
Figueroa
Gandul
Herrera
Hipódromo
Hoare
Isla Grande
Las Casas
Las Marías
Las Palmas
La Zona
Loíza
Machuchal
María Mozcó
Marruecos
Martín Peña
Melilla
Merhoff
Minillas
Miramar
Monteflores
Obrero
Ocean Park
Parque
Pozo del Hato
Pulguero
Sagrado Corazón
San Juan Moderno
San Mateo
Seboruco
Shanghai
Tras Talleres
Villa Palmeras

Collective terms (former “barrios”)
Sabana Llana is a former “barrio” of Río Piedras (current barrios of Sabana Llana Norte and Sabana Llana Sur, see above)
Monacillos is a former “barrio” of Río Piedras (current barrios of Monacillo and Monacillo Urbano, see above)
Hato Rey is a former “barrio” of Río Piedras (current barrios of Hato Rey Central, Hato Rey Norte, Hato Rey Sur, see above)

See also

 List of communities in Puerto Rico
 Old San Juan

References

 
San Juan